Karl H. Fell was a German politician of the Christian Democratic Union (CDU) and former member of the German Bundestag.

Life 
In 1964 Fell became a member of the CDU. He was represented in numerous party committees. From 26 July 1970 to 29 May 1985, Fell was a member of the state parliament of North Rhine-Westphalia. He was directly elected. He was a member of the German Bundestag from 1987 until his death on 5 December 1996.

References 

1936 births
1996 deaths
Members of the Bundestag for North Rhine-Westphalia
Members of the Bundestag 1994–1998
Members of the Bundestag 1990–1994
Members of the Bundestag 1987–1990
Members of the Bundestag for the Christian Democratic Union of Germany
Members of the Landtag of North Rhine-Westphalia